Girl Scout Cookie Championship is a television series on the Food Network. The series debuted in 2020. The series is hosted by Alyson Hannigan, while Katie Lee and Nacho Aguirre are permanent judges.

See also
 List of 2020 American television debuts

References

2020 American television series debuts
Food Network original programming